Werribee Open Range Zoo is an African themed zoo in Werribee, about  south-west of Melbourne, Victoria, Australia. It is part of the Zoological Parks and Gardens Board or Zoos Victoria, which also includes Melbourne Zoo and Healesville Sanctuary. It was originally agistment land to the Melbourne Zoo. Werribee Open Range Zoo is home to 360 animals of 40 species as of 2021.

Overview
Visitors to the zoo can take a bus tour, which normally lasts 35–40 minutes, multiple times a day, and takes up to 140 people per bus.

The zoo has a simulated African village, with educational and entertaining features, including a mock scenario of an African ranger and his adventures tracking lions, and an interactive soundscape walk with simulated lion sounds surrounding the walker. There are two independent trails that visitors may follow: the Pula Reserve Walking Trail which focuses on African animals and the Australian Journey Walk, which focuses on Australian animals.

There is a Learning Centre, which teaches more about the history and geography of animals in their environments.

Visitors can also book various "speciality" tours, including the Off Road Safari, or close encounters with gorillas or giraffe.

Werribee Open Range Zoo also has an animal/adoption sponsorship program, which is used for gifts and other altruistic purposes.

In April 2008 it was announced that a theme park known as African Safari World was proposed, by Warner Village Theme Parks to be built within the grounds of the zoo. On 1 July 2008 the proposed theme park plans were indefinitely postponed, the Government citing the potential $100 million cost to the taxpayer as the reason they were postponed.

Animals and exhibits

Safari Tour

American bison
Blackbuck
Common eland
Dromedary camel
Giraffe
Nyala
Ostrich
Plains zebra
Przewalski's horse
Scimitar oryx
Southern white rhinoceros
Waterbuck

African River Trail

African lion
African wild dog
Bell's hinge-back tortoise
Cheetah
Dumeril's boa
Hippopotamus
Leopard tortoise
Meerkat
Serval
Vervet monkey
Western lowland gorilla

Australian Trail

Eastern blue-tongued lizard
Eastern grey kangaroo
Emu
Koala
Orange-bellied parrot
Shingleback lizard
Tammar wallaby

Gorilla exhibit
In 2011, Werribee Zoo gained three male western lowland gorillas from Melbourne Zoo. These consist of an adult silverback and his two sons. The new public display gorilla habitat is a  sanctuary that features wide-open spaces, climbing structures and indoor facilities. This new facility enable Zoos Victoria to provide best-practice care for the bachelor gorillas and confirm the organisation's reputation as a world leader in gorilla management.  The Victorian Government recently gave $1.5 million to support the construction of this $2.2 million facility. Zoos Victoria Foundation is seeking public support to help raise the remaining $700,000 through the West Gorillas in the West campaign.

In 2010, the zoo made national headlines over the gorilla enclosure when comedy duo Hamish & Andy dressed in gorilla suits and played with radio controlled cars and golf clubs as part of a television special. Some viewers believed the zoo to be attempting to con them and complained.

Gallery

References

External links

1983 establishments in Australia
Zoos established in 1983
Tourist attractions in Victoria (Australia)
Zoos in Victoria (Australia)
Werribee, Victoria
Buildings and structures in the City of Wyndham